The Happy Club is the third solo studio album by Bob Geldof.

Track listing

UK / international version
All songs were written by Bob Geldof, except where noted.
 "Room 19" – 5:14
 "Attitude Chicken" – 4:36
 "The Soft Soil" – 7:29
 "A Hole to Fill" – 5:05
 "The Song of the Emergent Nationalist" (Geldof, Jamie Moses) – 6:55
 "My Hippy Angel" – 5:31
 "The Happy Club" (Geldof, Karl Wallinger) – 4:05
 "Like Down on Me" – 5:58
 "Too Late God" (Geldof, Karl Hyde) – 3:46
 "Roads of Germany (After B.D.)" – 5:14
 "A Sex Thing" – 5:09
 "The House at the Top of the World" (Geldof, Rick Smith) – 4:13
Great Songs of Indifference re-release
"Shine On" – 4:10
 "Huge Birdless Silence" – 3:24
 "Maybe Heaven" – 5:52

US version
All songs were written by Bob Geldof, except where noted.
 "Room 19"
 "A Hole to Fill"
 "The Song of the Emergent Nationalist" (Geldof, Jamie Moses)
 "Attitude Chicken"
 "Yeah, Definitely"
 "The House at the Top of the World" (Geldof, Rick Smith)
 "The Soft Soil"
 "A Sex Thing"
 "My Hippy Angel"
 "The Happy Club" (Geldof, Karl Wallinger)
 "Like Down on Me"
 "Too Late God" (Geldof, Karl Hyde)
 "Roads of Germany (After B.D.)"

Personnel

The Happy Clubsters
 Bob Geldof – lead vocals, acoustic and electric guitars, harmonica
 Pete Briquette – bass guitar, keyboards, programming 
 Bob Loveday – violin, penny whistle, bass guitar, recorder
 Geoff Richardson – viola, mandolin, electric and acoustic guitar, saxophone, ukulele, penny whistle
 Jamie Moses – electric and acoustic guitars
 Niall Power – drums
 Alan Dunn – accordion, piano, tin whistle, organ, one-row melodeon, keyboards
 Spike Edney – organ, piano, guitar, keyboards

Trainee Clubster
 Karl Wallinger - guitar, drums, vocals, keyboards

Production
 Johnny Milton – engineer
 Stephen W. Taylor – engineer

References

1992 albums
Bob Geldof albums
Albums produced by Rupert Hine
Mercury Records albums